The International Dark-Sky Association (IDA) is a United States-based non-profit organization incorporated in 1988 by founders David Crawford, a professional astronomer, and Tim Hunter, a physician and amateur astronomer. The mission of the IDA is "to preserve and protect the night time environment and our heritage of dark skies through quality outdoor lighting."

Light pollution is the result of outdoor lighting that is not properly shielded, allowing light shine into the eyes and night sky. Direct light that shines into the eyes is called glare, and light directed into the night sky above the horizon causes skyglow. Lighting can also cause light trespass when it enters areas where unwanted (e.g. a neighbor's yard and windows). IDA was the first organization in the dark-sky movement, and is currently the largest.

Principal approach
IDA's principal approach is to raise awareness about the value of dark, star-filled night skies and encourage their protection and restoration through education about the problems and solutions, including outdoor lighting practices that create less light pollution. In 2011, the organization had about 5,000 members in 70 countries.

International Dark Sky Places

To promote awareness about the issues, the IDA has an International Dark Sky Places program that aims "to encourage communities, parks and protected areas around the world to preserve and protect dark sites through responsible lighting policies and public education". There are currently five types of designation for International Dark Sky Places: 
 International Dark Sky Sanctuaries
 International Dark Sky Parks
 International Dark Sky Reserves
 International Dark Sky Communities
 Urban Night Sky Places

International Dark Sky Sanctuaries
IDA describes Dark Sky Sanctuaries as "the most remote (and often darkest) places in the world whose conservation state is most fragile".
 !Ae!Hai Kalahari Heritage Park South Africa, designated 2019
  Aotea / Great Barrier Island New Zealand, designated 2017
 Boundary Waters Canoe Area Wilderness United States, designated 2020
 Beaver Island
  Cosmic Campground United States, designated 2016
  Devils River State Natural Area – Del Norte Unit United States, designated 2019
  Bardsey Island/Ynys Enlli - Wales (United Kingdom), designated 2023
 Gabriela Mistral Dark Sky Sanctuary Elqui Valley, Chile, designated 2015
 Katahdin Woods and Waters National Monument United States, designated 2020
 Massacre Rim Wilderness Study Area Washoe County, Nevada United States, designated 2019
 Medicine Rocks State Park United States, designated 2020
 Niue, designated 2020 – the first entire country to be designated.
 Pitcairn Islands designated 2019
 Rainbow Bridge National Monument United States, designated 2018
 Stewart Island / Rakiura New Zealand, designated 2019 
  The Jump-Up Australia, designated 2019

International Dark Sky Parks
IDA describes Dark Sky Parks as "publicly- or privately-owned spaces protected for natural conservation that implement good outdoor lighting and provide dark sky programs for visitors".
 Natural Bridges National Monument, Utah, United States, designated 2006
 Cherry Springs State Park, Pennsylvania, United States, designated 2008
 Galloway Forest Park, Scotland, United Kingdom, designated 2009
 Zselic National Landscape Protection Area, Hungary, designated 2009
 Clayton Lake State Park, New Mexico, United States, designated 2010
 Goldendale Observatory State Park, Washington, United States, designated 2010, suspended 2016, revoked 2017
 Hortobágy National Park, Hungary, designated 2011
 The Headlands, Michigan, United States, designated 2011
 Observatory Park, Ohio, United States, designated 2011
 Big Bend National Park, Texas, United States, designated 2012
 Big Bend Ranch State Park, Texas, United States, designated 2017
 Death Valley National Park, California, United States, designated 2013
 Chaco Culture National Historical Park, New Mexico, United States, designated 2013
 Northumberland National Park, England, United Kingdom, designated 2013
 Eifel National Park, Germany, designated 2014
 Mayland Community College Blue Ridge Observatory and Star Park, North Carolina, United States, designated 2014
 Grand Canyon-Parashant National Monument, Arizona, United States, designated 2014
 Hovenweep National Monument, Utah and Colorado, United States, designated 2014
 Copper Breaks State Park, Texas, United States, designated 2014
 Enchanted Rock State Natural Area, Texas, United States, designated 2014
 Elan Valley Estate, Wales, United Kingdom, designated 2015
 Yeongyang Firefly Eco Park, Yeongyang, South Korea, designated 2015
 Mayo International Dark Sky Park, County Mayo, Republic of Ireland, designated 2016
 Warrumbungle National Park, New South Wales, Australia, designated 2016
 Dead Horse Point State Park, Utah, United States, designated 2016
 Waterton-Glacier International Peace Park, Alberta, Canada and Montana, United States, designated 2017
 Ramon Crater, Negev Desert, Israel, designated 2017
 Kartchner Caverns State Park, Arizona, United States, designated 2017
 Joshua Tree National Park, California, United States, designated 2017
 Craters of the Moon National Monument and Preserve, Idaho, designated 2017
 Obed Wild and Scenic River, Tennessee, United States, designated 2017
 Anza-Borrego Desert State Park, California, United States, designated 2018
 Iriomote-Ishigaki National Park, Okinawa Prefecture, Japan, designated 2018
 Steinaker State Park, Utah, United States, designated 2018
 Grand Canyon National Park, Arizona, United States, designated 2019
 Great Sand Dunes National Park and Preserve, Colorado, United States, designated 2019
 Hehuan Mountain, Nantou County, Taiwan, designated 2019
 El Morro National Monument, New Mexico, United States, designated 2019
 Kōzu-shima, Tokyo Metropolis, Japan, designated 2020
 Quetico Provincial Park, Ontario, Canada, designated 2021
 Valles Caldera National Preserve, New Mexico, United States, designated 2021
 City of Rocks National Reserve, Idaho, United States, designated 2023

International Dark Sky Reserves
IDA describes Dark Sky Reserves as "dark 'core' zones surrounded by a populated periphery where policy controls are enacted to protect the darkness of the core".
 Aoraki Mackenzie International Dark Sky Reserve, South Island, New Zealand, designated 2012
 Brecon Beacons National Park, Wales, United Kingdom, designated 2013
 Central Idaho Dark Sky Reserve, Idaho, United States, designated 2017
 Exmoor National Park, England, United Kingdom, designated 2011
 Kerry International Dark-Sky Reserve, County Kerry, Ireland, designated 2014
 The Reserve at Mont-Mégantic, Quebec, Canada, designated 2008
 Moore's Reserve (South Downs), England, designated 2016
 NamibRand Nature Reserve, Namibia, Africa, designated 2012
 Pic du Midi, France, designated 2013
 Rhön Biosphere Reserve, Germany, designated 2014
 River Murray International Dark Sky Reserve, near Swan Reach, South Australia, designated 2019
 Snowdonia National Park, Wales, designated 2015
 Westhavelland Nature Park, Germany, designated 2014
 Newport State Park, Wisconsin, United States, designated 2017
 Indian Astronomical Observatory (IAO), India, designated 2022

International Dark Sky Communities
IDA describes Dark Sky Communities as "legally organized cities and towns that adopt quality outdoor lighting ordinances and undertake efforts to educate residents about the importance of dark skies".
 Flagstaff, Arizona, United States, designated 2001
 Borrego Springs, California, United States, designated 2009
 Sark, Channel Islands, designated 2011
 Homer Glen, Illinois, United States, designated 2011
 Coll in the Inner Hebrides of Scotland, designated 2013
 Dripping Springs, Texas, United States, designated 2014
 Beverly Shores, Indiana, United States, designated 2014
 Sedona, Arizona, United States, designated 2014
 Westcliffe and Silver Cliff, Colorado, United States, designated 2015
 Thunder Mountain Pootsee Nightsky, Arizona, United States, designated 2015
 Bon Accord, Alberta, Canada, designated 2015
 Horseshoe Bay, Texas, designated 2015
 Moffat, Scotland, designated 2016
 Big Park/Village of Oak Creek, Arizona, designated 2016
 River Oaks, Texas, Dark Sky Friendly Development of Distinction, designated 2017
 Ketchum, Idaho, designated 2017
 Møn, Denmark & Nyord, Denmark, designated 2017
 Fountain Hills, Arizona, designated 2018
 Torrey, Utah, designated 2018
 Camp Verde, Arizona, designated 2018
 Wimberley and Woodcreek, Texas designated 2018
 Crestone, Colorado, designated in 2020

Urban Night Sky Places 
IDA describes Urban Night Sky Places as "sites near or surrounded by large urban environs whose planning and design actively promote an authentic nighttime experience in the midst of significant artificial light at night, and that otherwise do not qualify for designation within any other International Dark Sky Places category".
 Fry Family Park, Ohio, U.S., designated 2021
 Palos Preserves, Illinois, U.S., designated 2021
 Stacy Park, Missouri, U.S., designated 2021
 Timpanogos Cave National Monument, Utah, U.S., designated 2020
 Valle de Oro National Wildlife Refuge, New Mexico, U.S., designated 2019

Fixture Seal of Approval 
To promote the use of responsible outdoor lighting that minimizes light pollution, the IDA offers a Fixture Seal of Approval program. The program provides objective, third-party certification for lighting products that minimize glare, reduce light trespass, and do not pollute the night sky.

See also
 Bortle Dark-Sky Scale
 Commission for Dark Skies
 CieloBuio, an Italian coordination for the protection of the night sky
 Dark-sky movement
 Dark-sky preserve
 Light pollution
 List of astronomical societies
 Sky brightness

References

External links
 Darksky.org: official International Dark-Sky Association website
 Darksky.org: Dark Sky Observing Sites & Destinations (archived 6 July 2010)

+
Astronomy organizations
Environmental organizations based in Arizona
Environmental organizations established in 1988
Scientific organizations established in 1988
Event management companies